Formal, formality, informal or informality imply the complying with, or not complying with, some set of requirements (forms, in Ancient Greek). They may refer to:

Dress code and events
 Formal wear, attire for formal events
 Semi-formal attire, attire for semi-formal events
 Informal attire, more controlled attire than casual but less than formal 
 Formal (university), official university dinner, ball or other event
 School formal, official school dinner, ball or other event

Logic and mathematics
Formal logic, or mathematical logic
 Informal logic, the complement, whose definition and scope is contentious
Formal fallacy, reasoning of invalid structure
 Informal fallacy, the complement
Informal mathematics, also called naïve mathematics
Formal cause, Aristotle's intrinsic, determining cause
Formal power series, a generalization of power series without requiring convergence, used in combinatorics
Formal calculation, a calculation which is systematic, but without a rigorous justification
Formal set theory, as opposed to Naive set theory
Formal derivative, an operation on elements of a polynomial ring which mimics the form of the derivative from calculus

Computer science
Formal methods, mathematically based techniques for the specification, development and verification of software and hardware systems
Formal specification, describes what a system should do, not how it should do it
Formal verification, proves correctness of a system

Linguistics
Formal system, an abstract means of generating inferences in a formal language
Formal language, comprising the symbolic "words" or "sentences" of a formal system
Formal grammar, a grammar describing a formal language
T–V distinction, involving a distinction between formal and informal words for "you"
Formal proof, a fully rigorous proof as is possible only in a formal system
Dynamic and formal equivalence word-for-word translation, especially of the Bible

Chemistry
Formal concentration, molar concentration of original chemical formula in solution
Formal (pronounced "form-al")
A compound CH2(OR)2, named in analogy to acetals CHR1(OR)2 (historical definition) and ketals CR1R2(OR)2
Dimethoxymethane (CH2(OCH3)2) in particular, the formal derived from methanol

Social regulation
 A formality, an established procedure or set of specific behaviors
 Pro forma, for no purpose other than satisfying a formality
Informal activities:
 Informal education, education outside of a standard school setting
 Informal sector, the part of an economy that is not taxed, nor monitored by any form of government
 Informal settlement, or shanty town
 Informal value transfer system, outside the conventional banking system
 Informal social control, enforcing norms without resort to laws

Other
 Informal vote, a spoiled, void, null vote cast in an election
 MV Formality, coaster (formerly Empire Favourite) owned by F T Everard & Sons, scrapped in 1962

See also
 Form (disambiguation)
 Formalism (disambiguation)
 Formal theory (disambiguation)

cs:Formální